The Arnego River is a river in the province of Pontevedra, Galicia, Spain.  It is a tributary of the Ulla.

Etymology 
According to E. Bascuas, "Arnego", registered already as Arnego in 853, would derive from a form  *Arnaikom or *Arnekom, belonging to the old European hydronymy, and derived from the Indoeuropean  root *er- 'flow, move'.

See also 
 Rivers of Galicia

References

Rivers of Spain
Rivers of Galicia (Spain)